Conostigmus erythrothorax is a species of Megaspilid wasp in the family Megaspilidae.

References

Parasitic wasps
Articles created by Qbugbot
Insects described in 1893
Ceraphronoidea